Massalongia is a genus of flies in the family Cecidomyiidae. The larvae induce galls on birches.

Species
The following six species have been described in this genus:
 Massalongia altaica Fedotova, 1990
 Massalongia bachmaieri Möhn, 1954
 Massalongia betulifolia Harris, 1974
 Massalongia nakamuratetsui Elsayed & Tokuda 2020
 Massalongia papyrifera (Gagné, 1967)
 Massalongia rubra (Kieffer, 1890)

References 

Cecidomyiinae
Cecidomyiidae genera
Taxa named by Jean-Jacques Kieffer

Insects described in 1890
Gall-inducing insects